Kiwai Rural LLG is a local-level government (LLG) of Western Province, Papua New Guinea. Kiwaian languages are spoken in the LLG.

Wards
01. Sigabaduru
02. Mabudawan
03. Tureture
04. Sui
05. Severimabu
06. Doumori
07. Variobadoro
08. Maduduo (Waboda language speakers)
09. Tire'ere (Waboda language speakers)
10. Wapi (Waboda language speakers)
11. Sagasia
12. Buzi
13. Mawatta
14. Parama
15. Aberagerema
16. Wabada
17. Sepe
18. Samari
19. Kadawa
20. Madame
21. Maipani
22. Kename
23. U'uwo
24. Katatai

See also
Kiwaian languages
Kiwai Island

References

Local-level governments of Western Province (Papua New Guinea)